Podgórz may refer to:

Podgórz, Brodnica County in Kuyavian-Pomeranian Voivodeship (north-central Poland)
Podgórz, Nakło County in Kuyavian-Pomeranian Voivodeship (north-central Poland)
Podgórz, Lublin Voivodeship (east Poland)